Masdevallia bicolor is a species of orchid found from western South America to northwestern Venezuela.

References

External links 

bicolor
Orchids of South America
Orchids of Venezuela
Taxa named by Eduard Friedrich Poeppig
Plants described in 1837